Mobile instant messaging may refer to: 
 Messaging apps, such as WeChat, WhatsApp, and Facebook Messenger
Instant messaging technology, such as the defunct AIM but applied to mobile phones